The Ullen Sentalu Museum is a Javanese culture and art museum located in Kaliurang highland, Yogyakarta,  Java, Indonesia. The museum displays relics and artifact from royal houses and kratons of Java, such as Yogyakarta, Pakualam, Surakarta, and Mangkunegaran.

History
Ullen Sentalu Museum is a private museum that was initiated by Haryono family and now is managed by Ulating Blencong Foundation. It was established in 1994 and officially inaugurated on March 1, 1997, coinciding with the date commemorated every year as a historical day for Yogyakarta City. The inauguration was done by KGPAA Paku Alam VIII, who was at that time the Governor of Yogyakarta Special Province.

Some prominent figures have become members and counselors of the foundation, among other I.S.K.S. Paku Buwono XII of Kasunanan Surakarta Hadiningrat, KGPAA Paku Alam VIII of Pakualaman Principality, GBPH Poeger - Son of Sultan HB VIII - , GRAy Siti Nurul Kusumawardhani - daughter of Mangkunegara VII - , Hartini Sukarno - wife of the late President Sukarno - , and KP. Dr. Samuel Wedyadiningrat DSB. Konk.

Admission
IDR 100,000 (International visitor)
IDR 40,000 (Domestic/regular visitor/kitas)

secretariat
Jl. Plemburan 10, Yogyakarta Indonesia 55581

Literature

External links 
 Homepage

Museums in Yogyakarta
Museums established in 1994
1994 establishments in Indonesia
Art museums and galleries in Indonesia